The EMD TR1 was a two-unit "cow-calf" diesel locomotive built by General Motors Electro-Motive Division of La Grange, Illinois, in 1941. Two pairs were built for the Illinois Central Railroad, the only purchaser. 

The locomotive units strongly resembled the EMD NW3, with a long frame, Blomberg B road trucks, and a large cab connected to a wide area of hood that tapered going forward.

The cow and calf units were semipermanently coupled together with a drawbar instead of couplers, in similar fashion to the FT's twin-unit sets.

The two locomotive pairs were numbered 9250A&B and 9251A&B, later renumbered 1350A&B and 1351A&B. They initially were assigned to Markham Yard south of Chicago, IL, but by the early 1950s had been reassigned to the yard at East St. Louis, IL.  

Both remained in this service until they were retired in 1966 and traded in to EMD in part exchange for new EMD GP40 locomotives.

See also
List of GM-EMD locomotives

References 

 
 

B-B+B-B locomotives
TR01
Illinois Central locomotives
Railway locomotives introduced in 1941
Diesel-electric locomotives of the United States
Cow-calf locomotives
Standard gauge locomotives of the United States
Bo′Bo′+Bo′Bo′ locomotives
Scrapped locomotives

Shunting locomotives